Bos Trevis (1911–1984) was an English footballer who played for West Bromwich Albion.

References 

1910s births
1984 deaths
Leamington F.C. players
Worcester City F.C. players
West Bromwich Albion F.C. players
Association football midfielders
English footballers
Chester City F.C. players